Noyon (Noviomagus of the Veromandui, then ) is a commune in the Oise department, northern France.

Geography
The Oise Canal and the Canal du Nord pass through the commune. Noyon station is served by regional trains to Creil, Saint-Quentin, Compiègne and Paris.

History
The Gallo-Romans  founded the town as Noviomagus (Celtic for "New Field" or "Market"). As several other cities shared the name, it was distinguished by specifying the people living in and around it. The town is mentioned in the Antonine Itinerary as being 27 Roman miles from Soissons and 34 Roman miles from Amiens, but d'Anville noted that the distance must be in error, Amiens being further and Soissons closer than indicated.

By the Middle Ages, the town's Latin name had mutated to Noviomum. The town was strongly fortified; some sections of the Roman walls still remained in late antiquity. This may explain why, around the year 531, bishop Medardus moved his seat from Vermand in the Vermandois to Noyon. (Another option was to move his seat to Saint-Quentin but the wine produced in Noyon was thought to be much better than that produced in Saint-Quentin. Other explanations are that Medardus was born near the town, at Salency, or that the place is nearer to Soissons, which was one of the royal capitals of the Merovingians.) The bishop of Noyon was also bishop of Tournai from the seventh century until Tournai was raised to a separate diocese 1146.

The cathedral at Noyon was where Charlemagne was crowned as co-King of the Franks in 768, as was the first Capetian king, Hugh Capet in 987. In 859 the town was attacked by Vikings and the bishop, Immo, captured and killed. The town received a communal charter in 1108, which was later confirmed by Philip Augustus in 1223. In the twelfth century, the diocese of Noyon was raised to an ecclesiastical duchy in the peerage of France. The Romanesque cathedral was destroyed by fire in 1131, but soon replaced by the present cathedral, Notre-Dame de Noyon, constructed between 1145 and 1235, one of the earliest examples of Gothic architecture in France. The bishop's library is a historic example of half-timbered construction.

By the Treaty of Noyon, signed on the 13 August 1516 between Francis I of France and emperor Charles V, France abandoned its claims to the Kingdom of Naples and received the Duchy of Milan in recompense. The treaty brought the War of the League of Cambrai— one stage of the Italian Wars— to a close.

During King Henry II's Italian war in 1557, most of Noyon would be burned, in the midst of Philip II of Spain's invasion of Picardy, before returning to their winter quarters in the Spanish Netherlands.

Near the end of the sixteenth century the town fell under Habsburg control, but Henry IV of France recaptured it. The Concordat of 1801 suppressed its bishopric. The town was occupied by the Germans during World War I and World War II and on both occasions suffered heavy damage.

Population

Personalities 
 Saint Acarius, bishop of Doornik and Noyon (d. 14 March 642)
 Pope Innocent VI, Bishop of Noyon, born Étienne Aubert, Papacy (1352 - 1362).
 Antoine Henri de Bérault-Bercastel (1720 - 1794), priest, poet and historian.
 John Calvin (1509 – 1564), theologian, pastor, reformer, founder of the Calvinist movement.
 Alain Danilet (1947 - 2012), born in Noyon, politician.
 Pierre Descaves (1924 - 2014), served during World War II, municipal councillor of Noyon from 1989 to 2001, politician.
 Saint Eligius (588 - 660), bishop of Noyon-Tournai after Acarius (d. 1 December 660)
 Guillaume d'Ercuis (1265 — 1314/15), archdeacon, almoner, canon of the cathedral of Noyon.
 Paschal de l'Estocart  (1538 or 1539 – after 1587), born in Noyon, French Renaissance composer.
 Antoine Galland (1646 – 1715), orientalist, archaeologist, first European translator of One Thousand and One Nights, completed schooling at Noyon.
 Louis-André de Grimaldi (1736 – 1804), last Peer of France as Count-Bishop of Noyon from 1777.
 François de Maucroix (1619 - 1708), born in Noyon, long-time friend of La Fontaine, poet and translator.
 Pierre Robert Olivétan (c.1506 - 1538), born in Noyon, first to translate the Bible into the French language starting from the Hebrew and Greek texts. 
 Jacques Sarazin (1592 - 1660), born in Noyon, sculptor in the classical tradition of Baroque art.
 Medardus (456 – 545), was the Bishop of Vermandois who removed the seat of the diocese to Noyon.
 Bruno Roux (born 1963), French football player and manager
 Godeberta (c. 640 – c. 700), Frankish saint, resident in a small palace at Noyon, which included a chapel dedicated to Saint George.
 Jean de Bournonville (c. 1585 - 1632), composer and organist.
 Simon-Jérôme Bourlet de Vauxcelles, (1733  - 1802),  journalist during the French Revolution, curator of the bibliothèque de l'Arsenal (1787).
 Robert Louis Stevenson as part of An Inland Voyage visited Noyon on 17th September 1876. He was greatly impressed with the cathedral stating it has "the happiest inspiration of mankind, a thing as specious as a statue at first glance, yet on examination, as lively and interesting as a forest in detail…. I sat outside of my hotel and the sweet groaning thunder of the organ floated out of the church like a summons "

International relations
Noyon is twinned with:
  - Hexham – England
  - Metzingen – Germany

See also
 Communes of the Oise department
 Monument aux morts (Oise)
 Charlemagne

References

External links

 Official Web site
 Quid: Noyon
About the cathedral:
 Picardy architecture
 Gargoyles

 
Communes of Oise
Viromandui